Whitethorn or white thorn may refer to:

Plants 
 Acacia constricta, known as whitethorn acacia, a shrub in the family Fabaceae
 Bursaria spinosa, a small shrub in the family Pittosporaceae
 Ceanothus leucodermis, a shrub in the family Rhamnaceae
 Crataegus monogyna, the common hawthorn, a small tree in the family Rosaceae
 Crataegus punctata

Other 
 Whitethorn, California, United States
 Whitethorn (Blacksburg, Virginia), U.S., a historic house
 Whitethorn Woods, 2006 novel by Maeve Binchy

See also
 Whyte Thorne
 Blackthorn (disambiguation)